Love on the Beat is the fifteenth studio album by French singer and songwriter Serge Gainsbourg. On this album, Gainsbourg used American musicians to achieve a funk-heavy rock sound. The album was controversial due to its very sexual lyrical content, with homosexuality and prostitution as the subject matters on many of the tracks. Perhaps the most controversial was "Lemon Incest", which was set to Frédéric Chopin's Étude No. 3 and sung as a duet with his then-13-year-old daughter Charlotte Gainsbourg.

Critical reception

The French edition of Rolling Stone magazine named this album the 63rd greatest French rock album (out of 100).

Track listing

Personnel
Credits adapted from liner notes.

Musicians
 Serge Gainsbourg – vocals, synthesizer, arrangement
 Billy Rush – bass guitar, guitar, production, drum programming
 Larry Fast – synthesizer, synthesizer programming
 Stan Harrison – saxophone
 George Simms – backing vocals
 Steve Simms – backing vocals
 Charlotte Gainsbourg – vocals (on "Lemon Incest")

Technical
 John Rollo – recording engineering
 Nelson Ayres – engineering assistance
 Larry Alexander – mixing
 Jean Marie Guérin – mastering
 Jean-Pierre Haie – remastering
 Jean Ber – photography
 William Klein – photography
 Claude Delorme – photography
 Jacques Aubert – photography
 Philippe Lerichomme – production

Charts

References

External links
 
 

1984 albums
Serge Gainsbourg albums
Philips Records albums
Mercury Records albums
Obscenity controversies in music